Batocera malleti is a species of beetle in the family Cerambycidae. It was described by Schmitt in 2000. It is known from Laos.

References

Batocerini
Beetles described in 2000
Beetles of Asia